Kydon Karlopoulos (Greek: Κύδων Καρλόπουλος, born 3 May 1989) is a Greek footballer who plays for Makedonikos. Karlopoulos started his professional career for Iraklis and has also played for Olympiakos Volou and Kavala.

Club career
Karlopoulos started his professional career for Greek Superleague side Iraklis. He debuted for Iraklis as an injury time substitute, in a 5–0 away defeat of Iraklis. After being released from Iraklis, Karlopoulos signed a three-year contract on 31 August 2009 for Olympiakos Volou, then a Beta Ethniki side. His first match for Olympiakos Volou was a 1–3 home defeat from Kerkyra, for the opening round of the 2009-10 season. Until the end of the season Karlopoulos appeared in 11 matches. In the summer of 2010 Karlopoulos moved to Doxa Dramas. He debuted for the Mavraeti, as they won 2–0 against Kallithea. He only appeared in one more game for Doxa Dramas, before signing for Ethnikos on 31 January 2011. His debut for Ethnikos was made a week later, in an 0–1 away win against Anagennissi Karditsas and it was marked by Karlopoulos' sending off.

Achievements
Olympiakos Volou
Beta Ethniki
Winner (1): 2009–10

References

External links
 Kydon Karlopoulos in the official page of Iraklis Salonica 

Living people
Ethnikos Piraeus F.C. players
Iraklis Thessaloniki F.C. players
Olympiacos Volos F.C. players
Super League Greece players
1989 births
Association football midfielders
Footballers from Athens
Greek footballers